Tove Lie (1942 – 2000) was a Norwegian poet.

She made her literary debut in 1967 with the poetry collection Øyeblikk. Among her other collections are Syrinx from 1970, and Rullesteiner samler ikke mose from 1985.

She was awarded Mads Wiel Nygaards Endowment in 1985.

References

1942 births
2000 deaths
Writers from Oslo
Norwegian women poets
20th-century Norwegian poets
Date of birth missing
Date of death missing
20th-century Norwegian women writers